The 1914 Les Avants Tournament was an international ice hockey tournament held in Les Avants, Switzerland from January 16-18, 1914. Five teams participated in the tournament, which was won by Prince's Ice Hockey Club of Great Britain.

Results

Final Table

See also
1911 Les Avants Ice Hockey Tournament

External links
 Tournament on hockeyarchives.info

Les Avants Ice Hockey Tournament
Les Avants
Les Avants